Magistra Hersend, also called Hersend or Magistra Hersend Physica (floruit 1249–1259, Paris) was a French female surgeon who accompanied King Louis IX of France on the Seventh Crusade in 1249. She is one of two women recorded as royal physician or surgeon.

As well as ministering to the king she was placed in charge of the queen and the female camp followers. In the city of Acre she received a life pension of twelve pence a day from the King for her service. She later married the king's apothecary, one Jacques.

Magistra Hersend was an important woman in the life King Louis IX. She was the medical attendant to King Louis IX and attended the queen, Marguerite: Isabel (Elizabeth) queen of Portugal.  Her most important role was that she accompanied King Louis IX on the seventh crusade. Because of her work and loyalty to the king and queen, King Louis IX granted her a life pension of twelve pence a day. Later on, Magistra Hersend eventually married the royal apothecary. She also was one of the women who attended the royal couple and female camp followers.

See also
 Guillemette du Luys

References

Date of birth unknown
Date of death unknown
Year of birth unknown
Year of death unknown
French military doctors
French surgeons
Medieval women physicians
13th-century French physicians
Women in medieval European warfare
Women in war in France
French courtiers
Women in 13th-century warfare
13th-century French women
Medieval French scientists
Medieval surgeons